Rosalinde Kikstra (born 7 September 1987) is a Dutch fashion model, and the winner of Benelux' Next Top Model, Cycle 1.

Benelux' Next Top Model
At the semi-finals, Rosalinde was the seventh girl called to join the final thirteen competing for Benelux' Next Top Model, Cycle 1. Throughout the competition, she had been called first one time, being widely considered as a natural beauty and photogenic by the judges. She also received praise for her consistent photos and chameleon portfolio. She struggled with expressing herself in front of the judges, and landed in the bottom two for the first (and only) time before the live finale, but survived against fellow competitor Lianne Bakker. At the final live show, she was chosen by three out of the five judges as Benelux' Next Top Model.

Career

Agency Affiliation
Rosalinde is signed with MTA Models in Amsterdam.

Runway
She has walked in a C&A fashion show.

Print Work
Kikstra appeared in a spread for Gillette Venus. Rosalinde won a spread in Beau Monde, as part of her BNTM prize package.

References

External links

1987 births
Living people
Dutch female models
Next Top Model winners
Models from Rotterdam